Goesharde Frisian (North Frisian: Gooshiirder) is a collective term for three of the ten dialects of the North Frisian language. Goesharde Frisian is spoken in the historical Goesharde region north of Husum. The three distinct dialects are Northern, Central and Southern Goesharde Frisian. The latter became extinct with the death of the two last speakers in 1980 and 1981 in Hattstedt. Central Goesharde Frisian is therefore now the southernmost dialect of mainland North Frisian. Two local varieties of Northern Goesharde have been extensively catalogued, those spoken around the villages of  Langenhorn (Hoorninger Fräisch) and Ockholm (Hoolmer Freesch).

Grammar

Verbs
Below are some common verbs in the Ockholm variant of Goesharde Frisian.

Current situation
The two remaining dialects of Goesharde Frisian are also threatened by acute extinction. Already in the early 20th century only Ockholm in the Northern Goesharde region had been identified as a "truly Frisian" village with a majority of Frisian-speaking households and children. Also the Central Goesharde Frisian is severely threatened. In 2006 the last local speaker died in Bohmstedt and only few speakers are remaining in Drelsdorf.

References

North Frisian language